The 23rd Central American Championships in Athletics were held at the Estadio de Atletismo del Instituto Nicaragüense de Deportes in Managua, Nicaragua, between June 15-17, 2012. 

A total of 44 events were contested, 22 by men and 22 by women.

Medal summary
Complete results and medal winners were published.

Men

Women

Medal table (unofficial)

Team trophies
Costa Rica won the overall team trophy and the team
trophy in the men's category. Panama won the team trophy in the women's
category

Total

Male

Female

References

 
International athletics competitions hosted by Nicaragua
Central American Championships in Athletics
Central American Championships in Athletics
Central American Championships in Athletics
Sport in Managua